The following is an alphabetical list of topics related to the French overseas collectivity of Saint Martin.

0–9 

.mf – Internet country code top-level domain for the French overseas collectivity of Saint-Martin

A
Adjacent country:
 - Sint Maarten
Airports on Saint Martin
Americas
North America
North Atlantic Ocean
West Indies
Mer des Caraïbes (Caribbean Sea)
Antilles
Petites Antilles (Lesser Antilles)
Islands of Saint Martin (France)
Saint-Martin
Antilles
Arrondissement of Saint-Martin-Saint-Barthélemy
Atlas of Saint-Martin

B

C
Capital of Saint-Martin:  Marigot
Caribbean
Caribbean Sea
Categories:
:Category:Saint Martin (island)
:Category:Communications in Saint Martin (island)
:Category:Collectivity of Saint Martin culture
:Category:Geography of the Collectivity of Saint Martin
:Category:History of the Collectivity of Saint Martin
:Category:Maps of Saint Martin
:Category:Natural history of Saint Martin (island)
:Category:Collectivity of Saint Martin
:Category:Communications in the Collectivity of Saint Martin
:Category:Collectivity of Saint Martin culture
:Category:Geography of the Collectivity of Saint Martin
:Category:History of the Collectivity of Saint Martin
:Category:Politics of the Collectivity of Saint Martin
:Category:Collectivity of Saint Martin-related lists
:Category: Populated places in the Collectivity of Saint Martin
:Category:Sport in the Collectivity of Saint Martin
:Category:Transport in the Collectivity of Saint Martin
commons:Category:Saint Martin (France)
:Category:Saint Martin society
:Category:Sint Maarten
commons:Category:Saint Martin (island)
Coat of arms of Saint Martin (France)
Collectivité de Saint-Martin (French overseas collectivity of Saint Martin)
Comité de Football des Îles du Nord
Communications in Saint Martin (France)
Culture of Saint Martin

D

E
Eilandgebied Sint Maarten

F

Flag of France
Flag of Saint Martin (France)
France
French America
French colonization of the Americas
French language
French overseas collectivity of Saint Martin (Collectivité de Saint-Martin)
French Republic (République française)

G

H
History of Saint Martin
Hurricane Lenny
Hurricane Luis

I
Île de Saint-Martin
Île Tintamarre
International Organization for Standardization (ISO)
ISO 3166-1 alpha-2 country code for Saint Martin (France): MF
ISO 3166-1 alpha-3 country code for Saint Martin (France): MAF
Islands of Saint Martin (France):
Northern portion of the island of Saint Martin
Caye Verte
Crowl Rock
Grand Îlet
Île Tintamarre
Petite Clef
Pinel (Saint-Martin)
Rocher de l’Anse Marcel

J

K

L
L'Espérance Airport
Lists related to Saint-Martin:
List of airports in Saint Martin
List of islands of Saint Martin (France)
List of political parties in Saint Martin (France)
List of rivers of Saint Martin (France)
Outline of Saint Martin

M
Marigot – Capital of Saint-Martin

N
Nance
Netherlands Antilles

O
O sweet Saint-Martin's Land (bi-national song/anthem of Saint-Martin/Sint-Maarten)

P
Political parties in Saint Martin (France)
Politics of Saint Martin (France)

Q
Related readings

Baldachino, Godfrey (2006), "The Impact of Public Policy on Entrepreneurship: A Critical Investigation of the Protestant Ethic on a Divided Island Jurisdiction," Journal of Small Business and Entrepreneurship 19 (4), pp. 419–430.

Dana, Leo Paul (1990), “Saint Martin/Sint Maarten: A Case Study of the Effects of Politics and Culture on Economic Development,” Journal of Small Business Management XXVIII (4) October, pp. 91–98.

Dana, Leo Paul (2010), Entrepreneurship & Religion, Cheltenham, United Kingdom: Edward Elgar, .

Houston, Lynn Marie (2005). Food Culture in the Caribbean. Greenwood Press, 2005. .

R
République française (French Republic)
Rivers of Saint Martin (France)

S
Saint Martin island
Saint Martin Creole language
2007 Saint Martin Territorial Council election
Saint Martin national football team
Saint-Martinois, citizen of Saint-Martin
Scouting in Saint Martin (France)
Simpson Bay Lagoon
Sint Maarten

T
Treaty of Concordia, 1648
Topic outline of Saint Martin (France)

U

V

W

X

Y

Z

See also

List of Caribbean-related topics
List of international rankings
Lists of country-related topics
Topic outline of geography
Topic outline of North America

References

External links

 
Saint Martin (France)